Commodore International (other names include Commodore International Limited) was an American home computer and electronics manufacturer founded by Jack Tramiel. Commodore International (CI), along with its subsidiary Commodore Business Machines (CBM), was a significant participant in the development of the home-computer industry in the 1970s, 1980s and early 1990s. The company developed and marketed the world's best-selling computer, the Commodore 64 (1982), and released its Amiga computer line in July 1985. With quarterly sales ending 1983 of $ (equivalent to $ in ), Commodore was one of the world's largest personal computer manufacturers.

History

Founding and early years

Commodore co-founders Jack Tramiel and Manfred Kapp met in the early 1950s while both employed by the Ace Typewriter Repair Company in New York City. In 1954, they formed a partnership to sell used and reconditioned typewriters and used their profits to purchase the Singer Typewriter Company. After acquiring a local dealership selling Everest adding machines, Tramiel convinced Everest to give him and Kapp exclusive Canadian rights to its products and established Everest Office Machines in Toronto in 1955.

By 1958, the adding machine business was slowing, but Tramiel made a connection with an Everest agent in England who alerted him to a business opportunity to import into Canada portable typewriters manufactured by a Czechoslovakian company. On October 10, 1958, Tramiel and Kapp incorporated Commodore Portable Typewriter, Ltd. in Toronto to sell the imported typewriters. Commodore funded its operations through factoring over its first two years, but faced a continual cash crunch. To bolster the company's financial condition, Tramiel and Kapp sold a portion of the company to Atlantic Acceptance Corporation, one of Canada's largest financing companies, and Atlantic President C. Powell Morgan became chairman of Commodore. In 1962, the company went public on the Montreal Stock Exchange, under the name of Commodore Business Machines (Canada), Ltd.

With the financial backing of Atlantic Acceptance, Commodore expanded rapidly in the early 1960s. It purchased a factory in West Germany to manufacture its own typewriters, began distributing office furniture for a Canadian manufacturer, and sold Pearlsoud radio and stereo equipment. In 1965, it purchased the furniture company for which it served as the distributor and moved its headquarters to that company's facilities on Warden Avenue in the Scarborough district of Toronto. That same year, the company made a deal with a Japanese manufacturer to produce adding machines for Commodore and purchased the office supply retailer Wilson Stationers to serve as an outlet for its typewriters.

In 1965, Atlantic Acceptance collapsed when it failed to make a routine payment. A subsequent investigation by a royal commission revealed a massive fraud scheme in which the company falsified financial records to acquire loans funneled into a web of subsidiaries in which C. Powell Morgan held a personal stake. Morgan then either pocketed the money or invested it in a series of unsuccessful ventures. Commodore was one of the Atlantic subsidiaries directly implicated in this scheme, but the commission was unable to find any evidence of wrongdoing on the part of Tramiel or Kapp despite heavy suspicion. Nevertheless, the scandal left Commodore in a bad financial position because it had borrowed heavily from Atlantic to purchase Wilson, and the loan was called in. Due to the financial scandal, Tramiel could only secure a bridge loan by paying interest well above the prime rate and putting the German factory up as collateral. To extricate himself, Tramiel worked with a financier named Irving Gould, who brokered a deal to sell Wilson Stationers to an American company. Commodore now owed Gould money and still did not have sufficient capital to meet its payments, so Tramiel sold 17.9% of the company to Gould in 1966 for $500,000. As part of the deal, Gould became the new chairman of the company.

Through his Japanese contacts, Tramiel saw some of the first electronic calculators in the late 1960s and pivoted from adding machines to marketing calculators produced by companies like Casio under the Commodore brand name. In 1969, Commodore began manufacturing its own electronic calculators. Commodore soon had a profitable calculator line and was one of the more popular brands in the early 1970s, producing both consumer as well as scientific/programmable calculators. However, in 1975, Texas Instruments, the main supplier of calculator parts, entered the market directly and put out a line of machines priced at less than Commodore's cost for the parts. Commodore obtained an infusion of cash from Gould, which Tramiel used beginning in 1976 to purchase several second-source chip suppliers, including MOS Technology, Inc., in order to assure his supply. He agreed to buy MOS, which was having troubles of its own, only on the condition that its chip designer Chuck Peddle join Commodore directly as head of engineering.

Through the 1970s, Commodore also produced numerous peripherals and consumer electronic products such as the Chessmate, a chess computer based around a MOS 6504 chip, released in 1978.

"Computers for the masses, not the classes"

Chuck Peddle convinced Jack Tramiel that calculators were already a dead end and that they should turn their attention to home computers. Peddle packaged his single-board computer design in a metal case, initially with a keyboard using calculator keys, later with a full-travel QWERTY keyboard, monochrome monitor, and tape recorder for program and data storage, to produce the Commodore PET (Personal Electronic Transactor). From PET's 1977 debut, Commodore would be a computer company.

Commodore had been reorganized the year before into Commodore International, Ltd., moving its financial headquarters to the Bahamas and its operational headquarters to West Chester, Pennsylvania, near the MOS Technology site. The operational headquarters, where research and development of new products occurred, retained the name Commodore Business Machines, Inc. In 1980 Commodore launched production for the European market in Braunschweig, Germany.

By 1980, Commodore was one of the three largest microcomputer companies and the largest in the Common Market. The company had lost its early domestic-market sales leadership, however; by mid-1981 its US market share was less than 5%, and US computer magazines rarely discussed Commodore products. BYTE stated of the business computer market that "the lack of a marketing strategy by Commodore, as well as its past nonchalant attitude toward the encouragement and development of good software, has hurt its credibility, especially in comparison to the other systems on the market". The author of Programming the PET/CBM (1982) stated in its introduction that "CBM's product manuals are widely recognized to be unhelpful; this is one of the reasons for the existence of this book."

Commodore reemphasized the US market with the VIC-20. The PET computer line was used primarily in schools, where its tough all-metal construction and ability to share printers and disk drives on a simple local area network were advantages, but PETs did not compete well in the home setting where graphics and sound were important. Commodore bought aggressive advertisements featuring William Shatner asking consumers "Why buy just a video game?" The strategy worked and the VIC-20 became the first computer to ship more than one million units. A total of 2.5 million units were sold over the machine's lifetime and helped Commodore's sales to Canadian schools. In another promotion aimed at schools (and as a way of getting rid of old unsold inventory), some PET models labeled "Teacher's PET" were given away as part of a "buy 2 get 1 free" promotion.

In 1982, Commodore introduced the Commodore 64 as the successor to the VIC-20. Thanks to a well-designed set of chips designed by MOS Technology, the Commodore 64, (also referred to as C64), possessed remarkable sound and graphics for its time and is often credited with starting the computer demo scene. Its  price was high compared with that of the VIC-20, but it was still much less expensive than any other 64K computer on the market. Early C64 advertisements boasted, "You can't buy a better computer at twice the price." Australian adverts in the mid-1980s used a tune speaking the words "Are you keeping up with the Commodore? Because the Commodore is keeping up with you."

In 1983, Tramiel decided to focus on market share and cut the price of the VIC-20 and C64 dramatically, starting what would be called the "home computer war". TI responded by cutting prices on its TI-99/4A, which had been introduced in 1981. Soon there was an all-out price war involving Commodore, TI, Atari, and practically every vendor other than Apple Computer. Commodore began selling the VIC-20 and C64 through mass-market retailers such as K-Mart, in addition to traditional computer stores. By the end of this conflict, Commodore had shipped somewhere around 22 million C64s, making the C64 the best selling computer of all time.

At one point the company was selling as many computers as the rest of the industry combined. Its prices for the VIC-20 and 64 were $50 lower than Atari's prices for the 600XL and 800XL. Commodore's strategy was to, according to a spokesman, devote 50% of its efforts to the under- market, 30% on the  market, and 20% on the over- market. Although the company and Tramiel's focus on cost cutting over product testing caused some hardware defects in the initial 64, some resolved in later iterations by early 1984, Synapse Software—the largest provider of third-party Atari 8-bit software—received 65% of sales from the Commodore market, and Commodore sold almost three times as many computers as Atari that year.

Despite its focus on the lower end of the market, Commodore's computers were also sold in upmarket department stores such as Harrods. The company also attracted several high-profile customers. In 1984, the company's British branch became the first manufacturer to receive a royal warrant for computer business systems. NASA's Kennedy Space Center was another noted customer, with over 60 Commodore systems processing documentation, tracking equipment and employees, costing jobs, and ensuring the safety of hazardous waste.

Tramiel quits; the Amiga vs. ST battle

Although Creative Computing compared the company to "a well-armed battleship [which] rules the micro waves" and threatened to destroy rivals like Atari and Coleco, Commodore's board of directors were as impacted as anyone else by the price spiral and decided they wanted out. An internal power struggle resulted; in January 1984, Tramiel resigned due to intense disagreement with the chairman of the board, Irving Gould. Gould replaced Tramiel with Marshall F. Smith, a steel executive who had no experience with computers or consumer marketing. Tramiel's departure at the moment of Commodore's greatest financial success surprised the industry; he founded a new company, Tramel Technology (spelled differently so people would pronounce it correctly), and hired away a number of Commodore engineers to begin work on a next-generation computer design.

Now it was left to the remaining Commodore management to salvage the company's fortunes and plan for the future.

But Tramiel had beaten Commodore to the punch. His design was 95% completed by June. The Amiga chipset was already demonstrated at the CES in 1984, however the Atari ST was ready for retailers sooner.

During development in 1981, Amiga had exhausted venture capital and was desperate for more financing. Jay Miner and company had approached former employer Atari, and the Warner-owned Atari had paid Amiga to continue development work. In return, Atari was to get one-year exclusive use of the design as a video game console. After one year, Atari would have the right to add a keyboard and market the complete Amiga computer. The Atari Museum has acquired the Atari-Amiga contract and Atari engineering logs revealing that the Atari Amiga was originally designated as the 1850XLD. As Atari was heavily involved with Disney at the time, it was later code-named "Mickey", and the 256K memory expansion board was codenamed "Minnie".

The following year, Tramiel discovered that Warner Communications wanted to sell Atari, which was rumored to be losing about  a day. Interested in Atari's overseas manufacturing and worldwide distribution network for his new computer, he approached Atari and entered negotiations. After several on-again/off-again talks with Atari in May and June 1984, Tramiel had secured his funding and bought Atari's Consumer Division (which included the console and home computer departments) in July.

As more execs and researchers left Commodore after the announcement to join up with Tramiel's new company Atari Corp., Commodore followed by filing lawsuits against four former engineers for theft of trade secrets in late July. This was intended, in effect, to bar Tramiel from releasing his new computer.

One of Tramiel's first acts after forming Atari Corp. was to fire most of Atari's remaining staff, and to cancel almost all ongoing projects, in order to review their continued viability. In late July/early August, Tramiel representatives discovered the original Amiga contract from the previous fall. Seeing a chance to gain some leverage, Tramiel immediately used the contract to counter-sue Commodore through its new subsidiary, Amiga, on August 13.

The Amiga crew, still suffering serious financial problems, had sought more monetary support from investors that entire spring. At around the same time that Tramiel was in negotiations with Atari, Amiga entered into discussions with Commodore. The discussions ultimately led to Commodore's intentions to purchase Amiga outright, which would (from Commodore's viewpoint) cancel any outstanding contracts including Atari Inc.'s. This "interpretation" is what Tramiel used to counter-sue, and sought damages and an injunction to bar Amiga (and effectively Commodore) from producing any resembling technology. This was an attempt to render Commodore's new acquisition (and the source for its next generation of computers) useless. The resulting court case lasted for several years, with both companies releasing their respective products. In the end, the Amiga computer outlasted the Atari.

Throughout the life of the ST and Amiga platforms, a ferocious Atari-Commodore rivalry raged. While this rivalry was in many ways a holdover from the days when the Commodore 64 had first challenged the Atari 800 (among others) in a series of scathing television commercials, the events leading to the launch of the ST and Amiga only served to further alienate fans of each computer, who fought vitriolic holy wars on the question of which platform was superior. This was reflected in sales numbers for the two platforms until the release of the Amiga 500 in 1987, which led the Amiga sales to exceed the ST by about 1.5 to 1, despite reaching the market later. However, the battle was in vain, as neither platform captured a significant share of the world computer market and only the Apple Macintosh would survive the industry-wide shift to Microsoft Windows running on PC clones.

Demise
Adam Osborne stated in April 1981 that "the microcomputer industry abounds with horror stories describing the way Commodore treats its dealers and its customers." Many in the industry believed rumors in late 1983 that Commodore would discontinue the 64 despite its great success because they disliked the company's business practices, including poor treatment of dealers and introducing new computers incompatible with existing ones. One dealer said "It's too unsettling to be one of their dealers and not know where you stand with them." After Tramiel's departure, another journalist wrote that he "had never been able to establish very good relations with computer dealers ... computer retailers have accused Commodore of treating them as harshly as if they were suppliers or competitors, and as a result, many have become disenchanted with Commodore and dropped the product line". However, upon the 1987 introduction of the Amiga 2000, Commodore retreated from its earlier strategy of selling its computers to discount outlets and toy stores, and now favored authorized dealers. Software developers also disliked the company, with one stating that "Dealing with Commodore was like dealing with Attila the Hun." At the 1987 Comdex, an informal InfoWorld survey found that none of the developers present planned to write for Commodore platforms. Although Comdex was oriented toward business computing, not Commodore's traditional consumer market, such a response did not bode well for Commodore's efforts to establish the Amiga as a business platform.

Tramiel's successor Smith left the company in 1986, as did Smith's successor Thomas Rattigan in 1987 after a failed boardroom coup. The head of Blue Chip Electronics, a former Commodore employee, described his former employer as "a well-known revolving door". Commodore faced the problem, when marketing the Amiga, of still being seen as the company that made cheap computers like the 64 and VIC; the 64 remained the company's cash cow but its technology was aging. By the late 1980s, the personal computer market had become dominated by the IBM PC and Apple Macintosh platforms and Commodore's marketing efforts for the Amiga were less successful in breaking the new computer into this now-established market than its promotions for the 8-bit line had been in making Commodore the home computer leader. The company put effort into developing and promoting consumer products that would not be in demand for years, such as an Amiga 500-based HTPC called CDTV. As early as 1986, the mainstream press was predicting Commodore's demise, and in 1990 Computer Gaming World wrote of its "abysmal record of customer and technical support in the past". Nevertheless, as profits and the stock price began to slide, The Philadelphia Inquirer's Top 100 Businesses annual continued to list several Commodore executives among the highest-paid in the region and the paper documented the company's questionable hiring practices and large bonuses paid to executives amid shareholder discontent.

Commodore failed to update the Amiga to keep pace as the PC platform advanced. CBM continued selling the Amiga 2000 with 7.14 MHz 68000 CPUs, even though the Amiga 3000 with its 25 MHz 68030 was on the market. Apple by this time was using the 68040 and had relegated the 68000 to its lowest end model, the black and white Macintosh Classic. The 68000 was used in the Sega Genesis, one of the leading game consoles of the era, PCs fitted with high-color VGA graphics cards and SoundBlaster (or compatible) sound cards had finally caught up with the Amiga's performance and Commodore began to fade from the consumer market. Although the Amiga was originally conceived as a gaming machine, Commodore had always emphasized the Amiga's potential for professional applications. But the Amiga's high-performance sound and graphics were irrelevant for most of the day's MS-DOS-based routine business word-processing and data-processing requirements, and the machine could not successfully compete with PCs in a business market that was rapidly undergoing commoditization. Commodore introduced a range of PC compatible systems designed by its German division, and while the Commodore name was better known in the US than some of its competition, the systems' price and specs were only average.

In 1992, the A600 replaced the A500. It removed the numeric keypad, Zorro expansion slot, and other functionality, but added IDE, PCMCIA and a theoretically cost-reduced design. Designed as the Amiga 300, a nonexpandable model to sell for less than the Amiga 500, the 600 was forced to become a replacement for the 500 due to the unexpected higher cost of manufacture. Productivity developers increasingly moved to PC and Macintosh, while the console wars took over the gaming market. David Pleasance, managing director of Commodore UK, described the A600 as a 'complete and utter screw-up'.

In 1992, Commodore released the Amiga 1200 and Amiga 4000 computers, which featured an improved graphics chipset, the AGA. The advent of PC games using 3D graphics such as Doom and Wolfenstein 3D spelled the end of Amiga as a gaming platform, due to mismanagement.

In 1993, the 'make or break' system, according to Pleasance, was a 32-bit CD-ROM-based game console called the Amiga CD32, but it was not sufficiently profitable to put Commodore back in the black. This was not a universal opinion at Commodore with hardware expert Rainer Benda who worked for Commodore Germany in Frankfurt stating 'The CD32 was a year late for Commodore. In other words, here, too, it might have been better to focus on the core business than jump on a console and hope to sell 300,000 or more units in a short period of time to avoid bankruptcy.

In 1992, all UK servicing and warranty repairs were outsourced to Wang Laboratories, which was replaced by ICL after failing to meet repair demand during the Christmas rush in 1992. Commodore International's Canadian subsidiary authorized 3D Microcomputers of Ontario to manufacture IBM PC clones with the Commodore brand in late 1993.

By 1994, only the operations in Canada, Germany, and the United Kingdom were still profitable. Commodore announced voluntary bankruptcy liquidation on May 6, 1994, causing the board of directors to "authorize the transfer of its assets to trustees for the benefit of its creditors", according to an official statement. With Commodore International having reported a  quarterly loss in the US, hopes were expressed that the UK and European divisions might be able to continue trading and even survive the demise of the parent company, with a management buyout considered a possibility. Other possibilities included the sale of profitable parts of the company to other parties, with Philips and Samsung considered "likely choices", however no sale was ever completed.

The company's computer systems, especially the C64 and Amiga series, retain a cult following decades after its demise.

Post–Commodore International Ltd.
Following its liquidation, Commodore's former assets went their separate ways, with none of the descendant companies repeating Commodore's early success. Both Commodore and Amiga product lines were produced in the 21st century, but separately with Amiga, Inc. being its own company and Commodore computers briefly being produced by Commodore USA, an unrelated Florida-based company that licensed the brand name. Other companies develop operating systems and manufacture computers for both Commodore and Amiga brands as well as software.

Commodore UK and Commodore BV (Netherlands) were the subsidiaries that survived the bankruptcy but failed to place a bid to buy out the rest of the operation, or at least the former parent company. Due to press exposure at the time Commodore UK was considered the front runner in the bid. Commodore UK and Commodore BV (Netherlands) stayed in business by selling old inventory and making computer speakers and some other types of computer peripherals. Commodore BV (Netherlands) dissolved in early 1995, leaving Commodore UK left to make a bid. However, Commodore UK withdrew its bid at the start of the auction process after several larger companies, including Gateway Computers and Dell Inc., became interested, primarily for Commodore's 47 patents relating to the Amiga. The only companies who entered bids were Dell and Escom. The successful bidder was German PC conglomerate Escom on April 22, 1995, beating Dell's bid by $6.6 million. Commodore UK went into liquidation on August 30, 1995.

In 1995 Escom paid US$14 million for the assets of Commodore International. It separated the Commodore and Amiga operations into separate divisions and quickly started using the Commodore brand name on a line of PCs sold in Europe. However, it soon started losing money due to over-expansion, and less than 12 months later declared bankruptcy on July 15, 1996, and was liquidated.

In September 1997, the Commodore brand name was acquired by Dutch computer maker Tulip Computers.

In July 2004, Tulip announced a new series of products using the Commodore name: fPET, a flash memory-based USB Flash drive; mPET, a flash-based MP3 Player and digital recorder; eVIC, a 20 GB music player. Also, it licensed the Commodore trademark and Chicken Lips logo to the producers of the C64 DTV, a single-chip implementation of the Commodore 64 computer with 30 built-in games.

In late 2004, Tulip sold the Commodore trademarks to Yeahronimo Media Ventures for €22 million. The sale was completed in March 2005 after months of negotiations. Yeahronimo Media Ventures soon renamed itself to Commodore International Corporation and started an operation intended to relaunch the Commodore brand. The company launched its Gravel line of products: personal multimedia players equipped with Wi-Fi, with the hope the Commodore brand would help them take off. The Gravel was never a success and was discontinued. On June 24, 2009, CIC renamed itself to Reunite Investments. CIC's founder, Ben van Wijhe, bought a Hong Kong-based company called Asiarim. The brand is now owned by C= Holdings (formerly Commodore International B.V.): Reunite became the sole owner of it in 2010, after buying the remaining shares from the bankrupt Nedfield, then sold it to Commodore Licensing BV, a subsidiary of Asiarim, later in 2010. It was sold again on November 7, 2011: this transaction became the basis of a legal dispute between Asiarim (which, even after that date, made commercial use of the Commodore trademark, among others by advertising for sale Commodore-branded computers, and dealing licensing agreements for the trademarks) and the new owners, that was resolved by the United States District Court for the Southern District of New York on December 16, 2013, in favour of the new owners.

The Commodore Semiconductor Group (formerly MOS Technology, Inc.) was bought by its former management and in 1995, resumed operations under the name GMT Microelectronics, utilizing a troubled facility in Norristown, Pennsylvania that Commodore had closed in 1992. By 1999 it had $21 million in revenues and 183 employees. However, in 2001 the United States Environmental Protection Agency shut the plant down. GMT ceased operations and was liquidated.

Ownership of the remaining assets of Commodore International, including the copyrights and patents, and the Amiga trademarks, passed from Escom to U.S. PC clone maker Gateway 2000 in 1997, who retained the patents and sold the copyrights and trademarks, together with a license to use the patents, to Amiga, Inc., a Washington company founded, among others, by former Gateway subcontractors Bill McEwen and Fleecy Moss in 2000. On March 15, 2004, Amiga, Inc. announced that on April 23, 2003, it had transferred its rights over past and future versions of the Amiga OS (but not yet over other intellectual property) to Itec, LLC, later acquired by KMOS, Inc., a Delaware company. Shortly afterwards, on the basis of some loans and security agreements between Amiga, Inc. and Itec, LLC, the remaining intellectual property assets were also transferred from Amiga, Inc. to KMOS, Inc. On March 16, 2005, KMOS, Inc. announced that it had completed all registrations with the State of Delaware to change its corporate name to Amiga, Inc. The Commodore/Amiga copyrights were later sold to Cloanto. AmigaOS (as well as spin-offs MorphOS and AROS) is still maintained and updated. Several companies produce related hardware and software today.

Commodore's former US headquarters in West Chester, Pennsylvania, is currently the headquarters to QVC.

In February 2017, an exhibition room for about 200 Commodore products was opened in Braunschweig, commemorating the European production site of Commodore which had up to 2000 employees.

Product line
This product line consists of original Commodore products.

Calculators

774D, 776M, 796M, 9R23, C108, C110, F4146R, F4902, MM3, Minuteman 6, P50, PR100, SR1800, SR4120D, SR4120R, SR4148D, SR4148R, SR4190R, SR4212, SR4912, SR4921RPN, SR5120D, SR5120R, SR5148D, SR5148R, SR5190R, SR59, SR7919, SR7949, SR9150R, SR9190R, US*3, US*8 and The Specialist series: M55 (The Mathematician), N60 (The Navigator), S61 (The Statistician).

6502-based computers
(listed chronologically)
 KIM-1 single-board computer (1976); was produced by MOS Technology, which was bought by Commodore
 Commodore PET/CBM range (1977)
 VIC-20 a.k.a. VIC-1001 (1980 [VIC-1001] – 1984) (CBM);
 Commodore CBM-II range a.k.a. B-range a.k.a. 600/700 range (1982–1984)
 Commodore MAX Machine Predecessor to C64 (1982)
 Commodore 64 including C64C (1982–1994)
 Commodore Educator 64 64 in a PET 40xx case (1983)
 Commodore SX-64 all-in-one portable C64 including screen and disk drive (1984–1986)
 Commodore 16 including C116, incompatible with C64 (1984)
 Commodore Plus/4 compatible with C16 (1984–1985)
 Commodore LCD LCD-equipped laptop (never released)
 Commodore 128 including 128D and 128DCR (1985–1989)
 Commodore 65 C64 successor (never released, an unofficial recreation was released as MEGA65)
 Commodore 900 workstation (never released)

Amiga

 Amiga 1000 (1985–1987)
 Amiga 500 incl. A500+ (1987–1991)
 Amiga 2000 incl. A2000HD (1987–1991)
 Amiga 2500 (1988–1991)
 Amiga 1500 (1987–1991)
 Commodore CDTV (1990)
 Amiga 3000 incl. Amiga 3000UX & Amiga 3000T (1990–1992)
 Amiga 4000 incl. A4000T (1992–1994)
 Amiga 600 (1992–1993)
 Amiga 1200 (1992–1994), rereleased by Escom (1995–1996)

x86 IBM PC compatibles
 Commodore PC compatible systems Commodore Colt, PC1, PC10, PC20, PC30, PC40 (1987–1993)
 Commodore PC laptops Commodore 286LT, 386SX-LT, 486SX-LTC, 486SX-LTF, (–1993) Pentium P120i Ultramedia, P166i Ultramedia and the P200i Ultramedia (1996–1997)

Game consoles
 Commodore TV Game 2000K/3000H (1975–1977) (IT page, 1st-gen home consoles list)
 Commodore MAX Machine predecessor to C64 (1982)
 Commodore 64 Games System (1990)
 Amiga CD32 (1993)

Monitors
1000, 1024, 1070, 1080, 1081, 1083S, 1084, 1084S, 1084ST, 1085S, 1201, 1402, 1403, 1404, 1405, 1407, 1428, 1428x, 1432D, 1432V, 1701, 1702, 1703, 1801, 1802, 1803, 1900M/DM602, 1901/75BM13/M1, 1902, 1902A, 1930, 1930-II, 1930-III, 1934, 1935, 1936, 1936ALR, 1940, 1942, 1950, 1960, 1962, 2002, A2024, 2080, 76M13, CM-141, DM-14, DM602

Printers

VIC 1520 plotter
A somewhat rare and niche piece of equipment, it used the ALPS mechanicals, and four color rotary pen setup that scrolled a 4¼" roll paper. The ALPS mechanism was shared with a number of other 8 bit computers of the era, including Tandy, Atari and Apple among others.

Software
Commodore's own software had a poor reputation; InfoWorld in 1984, for example, stated that "so far, the normal standard for Commodore software is mediocrity". Third parties developed the vast majority of software for Commodore computers.
 AmigaOS 32-bit operating system for the Amiga range; multitasking, micro kernel, with GUI
 Amiga Unix Operating system for the Amiga, based on Unix System V Release 4
 Commodore BASIC BASIC interpreter for the 8-bit range, ROM resident; based on Microsoft BASIC
 Commodore DOS Disk operating system for the 8-bit range; embedded in disk drive ROMs
 KERNAL Core OS routines for the 8-bit range; ROM resident.
 Magic Desk Planned series of productivity software for the C64; only the first entry was released
 Simons' BASIC BASIC extension for the C64; cartridge-based
 Super Expander BASIC and memory extension for the VIC-20; cartridge-based
 Super Expander 64 BASIC extension for the C64

References

External links

 Software Archive
 The Canonical List of Commodore Products – by Jim Brain, maintained by Bo Zimmerman
 Philadelphia Inquirer articles about Irving Gould

 
1954 establishments in Ontario
1994 disestablishments in Pennsylvania
American companies established in 1954
American companies disestablished in 1994
Defunct computer companies of the United States
Defunct computer hardware companies
Electronics companies of Canada
Electronic calculator companies
Home computer hardware companies
Computer companies established in 1954
Electronics companies established in 1954
Technology companies established in 1954
Computer companies disestablished in 1994
Technology companies disestablished in 1994
Companies that filed for Chapter 11 bankruptcy in 1994
Defunct companies based in Pennsylvania
West Chester, Pennsylvania
Re-established companies
Computer companies established in 2005
British Royal Warrant holders
Canadian companies established in 1954